Muricopsis (Risomurex) rosea, common name : the pink drupe, is a species of sea snail, a marine gastropod mollusk in the family Muricidae, the murex snails or rock snails.

Description
The shell grows to a length of 15 mm

Distribution
This species is distributed in the Caribbean Sea; the Gulf of Mexico; in the Indian Ocean along the Mascarene Basin.

References

 Drivas, J. & M. Jay (1988). Coquillages de La Réunion et de l'île Maurice
 Rosenberg, G., F. Moretzsohn, and E. F. García. 2009. Gastropoda (Mollusca) of the Gulf of Mexico, pp. 579–699 in Felder, D.L. and D.K. Camp (eds.), Gulf of Mexico–Origins, Waters, and Biota. Biodiversity. Texas A&M Press, College Station, Texas.

External links
 Gastropods.com : Muricopsis (Risomurex) roseus; accessed ; 18 December 2010

Muricidae
Gastropods described in 1846